Lithotelestidae is a family of coral in the order Helioporacea. It was erected in 1977 by Frederick Bayer and Katherine Muzik. It is characterized by a crystalline aragonite skeleton formed by stolons and calices, cylindrical calices with secondary lateral calices, and fully retractable polyps with an exoskeleton formed of calcite capstans and crosses.

Genera
Epiphaxum Lonsdale, 1850
Nanipora Miyazaki & Reimer, 2015

References

 
Helioporacea